Congregation Chasam Sopher is an Orthodox synagogue located at 10 Clinton Street on the Lower East Side of Manhattan.  

It was formed in 1892 by the merger of two congregations of immigrants from Poland.  It occupies a historic Romanesque Revival synagogue building built in 1853 by Congregation Rodeph Sholom. It is among the oldest synagogue buildings still standing in the United States, the second-oldest synagogue building in New York, and the oldest still in use in the state.  

Renovation of the upstairs, completed in 2006, included conservation of the Torah ark, the installation of new stained-glass windows, and stripping the interior of paint to expose the original wood. The outside was also landscaped, creating a garden for the neighborhood.

, the rabbi was Azriel Siff.

References

External links

 Synagogue website

Synagogues completed in 1853
Lower East Side
Synagogues in Manhattan
Orthodox synagogues in New York City
Religious organizations established in 1892
Polish-Jewish culture in New York City
1853 establishments in New York (state)
Romanesque Revival synagogues